Arthur Henrique Ricciardi Oyama (born 14 January 1987 in São Paulo), also known simply as Arthur or Arthur Henrique, is a Brazilian footballer who plays as a left back.

Career statistics
(Correct )

Honours
Santo André
Campeonato Paulista Série A2: 2008

References

External links
 ogol
 soccerway

1987 births
Living people
Brazilian footballers
Brazilian expatriate footballers
Campeonato Brasileiro Série A players
Campeonato Brasileiro Série B players
Primeira Liga players
First Professional Football League (Bulgaria) players
Maltese Premier League players
Esporte Clube Santo André players
Grêmio Barueri Futebol players
C.D. Nacional players
Botev Plovdiv players
K.S.C. Lokeren Oost-Vlaanderen players
Floriana F.C. players
Gżira United F.C. players
Sliema Wanderers F.C. players
Brazilian expatriate sportspeople in Portugal
Brazilian expatriate sportspeople in Bulgaria
Brazilian expatriate sportspeople in Belgium
Brazilian expatriate sportspeople in Malta
Expatriate footballers in Portugal
Expatriate footballers in Bulgaria
Expatriate footballers in Belgium
Expatriate footballers in Malta
Association football fullbacks
Footballers from São Paulo